Alice Chenoweth may refer to:

 Helen H. Gardener (1853–1925), American author, activist and civil servant, born Alice Chenoweth
 Alice Drew Chenoweth (1903–1998), physician